Costas Malekkos (born 9 April 1971) is a Cypriot former footballer who played as a midfielder for the Cyprus national team. He was the manager of Olympiakos Nicosia. He is considered one of the best Cypriot players of the 1990s.

Club career
Malekkos started off from Omonia where he played for eight years. Then, in 1997 he moved to Panathinaikos but after a year he returned to Cyprus again to Omonia. 

During his career, he played for other top Cypriot Clubs such as APOEL, AEL Limassol, Apollon Limassol, Olympiakos Nicosia and finished his career while playing for PAEEK FC.

International career
Malekkos had been also an important member of the Cyprus national football team, having 44 appearances and scoring 4 goals.

External links
 

1971 births
Living people
Cypriot footballers
Cyprus international footballers
Cypriot football managers
Greek Cypriot people
Association football forwards
Sportspeople from Nicosia
Super League Greece players
APOEL FC players
AC Omonia players
Apollon Limassol FC players
Olympiakos Nicosia players
AEL Limassol players
PAEEK players
Panathinaikos F.C. players
Cypriot expatriate footballers
Expatriate footballers in Greece